The 1999 Australian Super Touring Championship was an Australian motor racing competition for Super Touring Cars. It began on 18 April 1999 at Lakeside International Raceway and ended on 29 August at Calder Park Raceway after eight rounds and twenty one races. Promoted as the BOC Gases Australian Touring Car Championship, organised by TOCA Australia and sanctioned by the Confederation of Australian Motor Sport as an Australian Title, it was the seventh annual Australian championship for Super Touring Cars and the fifth to carry the Australian Super Touring Championship name.

Paul Morris won the Drivers Championship, Volvo won the Manufacturers Championship and Volvo Racing was awarded the Teams Championship.

Teams and drivers

The following drivers competed in the 1999 Australian Super Touring Championship.

Results and standings

Race calendar
The 1999 Australian Super Touring Championship consisted of twenty one races at eight rounds held in four different states. Two races were held at each of the first three rounds and three races were held at each of the remaining five rounds.

Drivers Championship
Points were awarded 15–12–10–8–6–5–4–3–2–1 based on the top ten race positions in each race. There was a bonus point allocated for pole position. The first three race meetings had a qualifying session for each race. After that there was just one qualifying session per round.

Manufacturers Championship

Manufacturers Championship points were awarded on a 15–12–10–8–6–5–4–3–2–1 basis for relative positions achieved by the best placed car from each eligible manufacturer at each race. Only two manufacturers were eligible to score points in the 1999 championship.

Teams Championship

Teams Championship points were awarded on a 15–12–10–8–6–5–4–3–2–1 basis for relative positions achieved by entries from multi-car teams at each race.

TOCA Challenge – Independents Cup

Independents Cup points were awarded on a 15–12–10–8–6–5–4–3–2–1 basis for relative positions achieved by drivers in entries nominated as Independents at each race.

References

External links
 1999 Racing Results Archive
 1999 Australian Super Touring Championship, www.supertouringregister.com

Australian Super Touring Championship
Super Touring Car Championship